Today Is Another Day is the 7th album of Zard and was released on July 8, 1996 under B-Gram Records label. Izumi Sakai produced the next four albums.

Charting performance
The album reached #1 rank first week. It charted for 40 weeks and sold more than 1,650,000 copies.

Track listing
All lyrics written by Izumi Sakai.

In media
My Friend: ending theme for Anime television series Slam Dunk
Today Is Another Day: theme song for Anime television series Yawara!
Ai ga Mienai: commercial song of FT Shiseido
Sayonara wa Ima mo Kono Mune ni Imasu: theme song for movie series "Shiratori Reiko de gozaimasu!"
Kokoro wo Hiraite: commercial song of Pocari Sweat

References 

Zard albums
1996 albums
Japanese-language albums
Being Inc. albums

Chart positions
{| class="wikitable"
!Year
!Album
!Chart
!Position
!First week sales
!Weeks
!Annual Sales
!Total Sales
!Yearly Position
|-
|1996
|TODAY IS ANOTHER DAY
|Japanese Oricon Weekly Albums Chart (Top 100)
|1
|774,190
|40
|1,573,630
|1,655,560
|12